The 1982 NCAA Men's Division II Ice Hockey Tournament involved 8 schools playing in single-elimination play to determine the national champion of men's NCAA Division II college ice hockey.  A total of 12 games were played, hosted by the University of Lowell.

The University of Lowell, coached by Bill Riley, won the national title with a 5-1 victory in the final game over Plattsburgh.

Paul Lohnes, of the University of Lowell, was named the Most Outstanding Player and Scott Swanson, of Gustavus Adolphus, was the high scorer of the tournament with eleven points (4 goals, 7 assists).

Qualifying teams
With the number of teams in the tournament doubling, the NCAA did not hold a western regional tournament. No automatic bids were offered.

Tournament bracket
The quarter-finals were two-game total-goals series played at the campus of the higher seed. The semi-finals and finals were single elimination games.

All-Tournament Team

G: John MacKenzie (Lowell)
D: Paul Lohnes (Lowell)
D: Rob Spath (Lowell)
F: Chip Grabowski (Plattsburgh State)
F: Ken Kaiser (Lowell)
F: Mike Carr (Lowell)

External links

NCAA men's ice hockey championship
 
NCAA Men's Division II Ice Hockey Tournament
NCAA Division II men's ice hockey tournament